is a Japanese-born American judoka. Matsumoto competed for the United States in the women's 48 kg judo event at the 2008 Summer Olympics.

Matsumoto, who was raised in California, is coached by her father, David Matsumoto. She began judo at the age of 5. Matsumoto won the 2004 U.S. Olympic Trials, but did not compete in the Olympics that year because the U.S. failed to earn a spot in her weight class. Matsumoto again won the U.S. Olympic Trials in 2008 and competed in the Olympic Games.

At the 2008 Summer Olympics she fought against Ryoko Tani (JPN) and Wu Shugen (CHN), but lost both matches.

References

External links
 
 
 
 
 
 

1982 births
Living people
American female judoka
Judoka at the 2003 Pan American Games
Judoka at the 2008 Summer Olympics
Olympic judoka of the United States
Sportspeople from Saitama Prefecture
Japanese emigrants to the United States
American sportspeople of Japanese descent
Pan American Games competitors for the United States
21st-century American women